Ròtova is a municipality in the comarca of Safor in the Valencian Community, Spain.

Main sights 
 Church of Sant Bartomeu Apòstol.
 Palace of the Counts of Ròtova.
Monastery of Sant Jeroni de Cotalba, constructed between the 14th and 18th centuries.

References

Municipalities in the Province of Valencia
Safor